Otto II, Count of Rietberg (died 18 July 1389) was the ruling Count of Rietberg from 1365 until his death.

Life 
He was the son of Conrad III and his wife Ermeswint of Reifferscheidt.

He inherited Rietberg when his father died in 1365.

He died on 18 July 1389 and was buried in the Marienfeld Abbey.

Marriage and issue 
Around 1370, Otto II married Adelaide, the daughter of Otto of Lippe from the neighboring County of Lippe.  They had the following children:
 Conrad IV, who was Count of Rietberg from 1389 to 1428
 John, a canon of Cologne, who fell in the Battle of Detern on 27 September 1426
 Otto (d. between 6 July and 7 October 1406), Bishop of Minden from 1403 until his death

References

External links 
 Biography

Counts of Rietberg
14th-century births
1389 deaths
Year of birth unknown
14th-century German nobility